Acanthograeffea denticulata, the denticulate stick insect, is the sole species of stick insect present in the Mariana Islands, where it is endemic.  It feeds on coconut fronds.

References

External links
 species Acanthograeffea denticulata (Redtenbacher, 1908) Phasmida Species File Online

Phasmatidae